1903 was the third year for the Detroit Tigers in the still-new American League. The team finished in fifth place with a record or 65–71 (.478), 25 games behind the Boston Americans.  The 1903 Tigers outscored their opponents 567 to 539. The team's attendance at Bennett Park was 224,523, sixth out of the eight teams in the AL.

Regular season

Season standings

Record vs. opponents

Roster

Player stats

Batting

Starters by position 
Note: Pos = Position; G = Games played; AB = At bats; H = Hits; Avg. = Batting average; HR = Home runs; RBI = Runs batted in

Other batters 
Note: G = Games played; AB = At bats; H = Hits; Avg. = Batting average; HR = Home runs; RBI = Runs batted in

Note: pitchers' batting statistics not included

Pitching

Starting pitchers 
Note: G = Games pitched; IP = Innings pitched; W = Wins; L = Losses; ERA = Earned run average; SO = Strikeouts

Awards and honors

League top five finishers 
Jimmy Barrett
 AL leader in on-base percentage (.407)
 AL leader in bases on balls (74)
 AL leader in times on base (243)
 #4 in AL in batting average (.315)
 #3 in AL in runs scored (95)
 #3 in AL in plate appearances (615)
 #4 in AL in singles (138)

Sam Crawford
 AL leader in runs created (98)
 MLB leader in triples (25)
 #2 in AL in batting average (.335)
 #2 in AL in hits (184)
 #2 in AL in total bases (269)
 #3 in AL in OPS (.855)
 #3 in AL in times on base (211)
 #4 in AL in slugging percentage (.489)
 #4 in AL in sacrifice hits (25)
 #5 in AL in RBIs (89)

Bill Donovan
 #2 in AL in strikeouts (187)
 #2 in MLB in hits allowed per 9 innings pitched (7.24)
 #2 in AL in strikeouts per 9 innings pitched (5.48)
 #2 in AL in bases on balls allowed (95)
 #5 in AL in wild pitches (7)

Harry "Candy" Kane
 2nd youngest player in AL (19)

Frank Kitson
 #4 in AL in home runs allowed (8)

Billy Lush
 MLB leader in sacrifice hits (34)
 #2 in AL in bases on balls (70)
 #3 in on-base percentage (.379)

Deacon McGuire
 2nd oldest player in the AL (39)

George Mullin
 AL leader in saves (2)
 AL leader in bases on balls allowed (106)
 #2 in AL in shutouts (6)
 #2 in games (41)
 #3 in AL in batters faced (1345)
 #5 in AL in strikeouts per 9 innings pitched (4.77)
 #5 in AL in strikeouts (170)
 #6 in AL in ERA (2.26)

Joe Yeager
 #4 in AL in times hit by pitch (9)

References 

 1903 Detroit Tigers Regular Season Statistics

Detroit Tigers seasons
Detroit Tigers season
Detroit Tigers
1903 in Detroit